Lethrinops christyi is a species of cichlid endemic to Lake Malawi where it is only known from the southern part of the lake.  This species grows to a length of  TL. The specific name honours the collector of the type, Cuthbert Christy (1863-1932), an explorer and naturalist.

References

christyi
Fish of Lake Malawi
Fish of Malawi
Fish described in 1931
Taxa named by Ethelwynn Trewavas
Taxonomy articles created by Polbot